The following is a list of feature films produced and distributed by the American studio Columbia Pictures from 1950 until 1959. While the company continued to make many of its films in-house, it increasingly also released films made by independent producers.

1950

1951

1952

1953

1954

1955

1956

1957

1958

1959

See also
 List of Columbia Pictures films

References

Bibliography
 Blottner, Gene. Columbia Pictures Movie Series, 1926-1955: The Harry Cohn Years. McFarland, 2011.
 Dick, Bernard F. Columbia Pictures: Portrait of a Studio. University Press of Kentucky, 2014.

1950
American films by studio
Sony Pictures Entertainment Motion Picture Group